This is a list of Australian films that have been released in 2020.

Films

See also
 2020 in Australia
 2020 in Australian television
 List of 2020 box office number-one films in Australia

References

2020
Australian
 Films